Canada competed at the 1980 Summer Paralympics in Arnhem, Netherlands. 94 competitors from Canada won 130 medals including 64 gold, 35 silver and 31 bronze and finished 4th in the medal table.

Medalists

See also 
 Canada at the Paralympics

References 

1980
1980 in Canadian sports
Nations at the 1980 Summer Paralympics